The Southwest administrative region of the Missouri Department of Conservation encompasses Barry, Barton, Cedar, Christian, Dade, Dallas, Greene, Hickory, Jasper, Laclede, Lawrence, McDonald, Newton, Polk, Stone, and Taney counties.  The regional conservation office is in Springfield.

Notes 

 Acreage and counties from MDCLand GIS file
 Names, descriptions, and locations from Conservation Atlas Online GIS file

References 

 
 

Southwest region